Coenopoeus is a genus of beetles in the family Cerambycidae, containing the following species:

 Coenopoeus niger Horn, 1894
 Coenopoeus palmeri (LeConte, 1873)

References

Acanthocinini